Lake Elizabeth, located in Central Park of Fremont, California, is a man made  lake with a 2 mile walkway around the lake.  When at average capacity, water rises to a depth of about seven feet.

About

Lake Elizabeth was named when it and the surrounding Central Park were dedicated to Fremont's sister city, Elizabeth, South Australia on March 22, 1969. Central Park and Lake Elizabeth began development in 1960.

Central Park and the lake are visited by hundreds of people every day, and the lake is commonly used for boating and other recreational activities too. The park is home to a large number of birds such as American coots, mallards, gulls, and also some very unusual birds who live near the small forest on the northern side of the park or on the small island (often called Duck Island), inaccessible to land bound visitors, in the center of the lake. Many people come to bicycle or jog around the lake's perimeter, and many families come for the two playgrounds in the park and the other three that it connects to by walkway. Many people also enjoy fishing at the lake, as it is free. Fishes that could be caught include sunfish, trout, catfish, and largemouth bass.   The Aqua Adventure water park lies in Central Park on the southern shore of Lake Elizabeth.

Hydrology
Lake Elizabeth has one island, named Duck Island, located in the eastern part of the lake. Mission Creek flows into Lake Elizabeth on the southern shore.

Tunnel
A pair of train tunnels were constructed under the lake by BART for the Warm Springs/San Jose BART extension. The tunnels were completed in 2012, and opened for revenue service in 2017.

See also
List of lakes in California

References

Geography of Fremont, California
Elizabeth
Elizabeth